Karl Olof Alfred "Olle" Bexel (14 June 1909 – 6 January 2003) was a Swedish decathlete. He finished seventh at the 1936 Summer Olympics and won a European title in 1938. Bexell was Swedish champion in the pentathlon in 1938 and in the decathlon in 1935–38. He held the national decathlon record from 1937 to 1966.

References

1909 births
2003 deaths
Swedish decathletes
Olympic athletes of Sweden
Athletes (track and field) at the 1936 Summer Olympics
European Athletics Championships medalists
People from Luleå
Sportspeople from Norrbotten County